The canton of Chinon is an administrative division of the Indre-et-Loire department, central France. Its borders were modified at the French canton reorganisation which came into effect in March 2015. Its seat is in Chinon.

It consists of the following communes:
 
 Avoine
 Azay-le-Rideau
 Beaumont-en-Véron
 Bréhémont
 Candes-Saint-Martin
 La Chapelle-aux-Naux
 Cheillé
 Chinon
 Cinais
 Couziers
 Huismes
 Lerné
 Lignières-de-Touraine
 Marçay
 Rigny-Ussé
 Rivarennes
 Rivière
 La Roche-Clermault
 Saché
 Saint-Benoît-la-Forêt
 Saint-Germain-sur-Vienne
 Savigny-en-Véron
 Seuilly
 Thilouze
 Thizay
 Vallères
 Villaines-les-Rochers

References

Cantons of Indre-et-Loire